The 2024 Northern Territory general election is scheduled to be held on 24 August 2024 to elect all 25 members of the Legislative Assembly in the unicameral Northern Territory Parliament.

Members will be elected through full preferential instant-runoff voting in single-member electorates. The incumbent centre-left Labor Party (ALP) majority government, currently led by Chief Minister Natasha Fyles, will attempt to win a third consecutive four-year term of government. It will be challenged by the centre-right Country Liberal Party (CLP) opposition, currently led by Opposition Leader Lia Finocchiaro.

The election will be conducted by the Northern Territory Electoral Commission.

Background
In the event both current leaders remain in place, this will be the first election in the Northern Territory where both major political parties are led by women, and the third in any Australian state or territory after the 1995 ACT election and 2020 Queensland election.

Previous election
At the 2020 election, the Labor government led by Chief Minister Michael Gunner was re-elected with a reduced majority, winning 14 of the 25 seats in the parliament. The Country Liberals (CLP) won 8 seats, whilst the Territory Alliance party won 1 seat and a further 2 seats were won by independents.

Parliamentary composition
Robyn Lambley, the Territory Alliance's sole representative in the parliament, left the party in October 2020 to sit as an independent. Labor MLA Mark Turner was expelled from the party-room caucus in February 2021 due to what he acknowledged as an "inappropriate relationship" with a Labor Party staffer, though he remained a Labor-designated member in the assembly. 

A by-election was held for the seat of Daly on 11 September 2021, caused by the resignation of CLP member Ian Sloan due to health and personal issues. Labor candidate Dheran Young won the seat, the first time that an incumbent government has won a seat from the opposition in the history of the Legislative Assembly.

On 10 May 2022, Chief Minister and Labor leader Michael Gunner announced his immediate resignation from both positions, citing his desire to spend more time with his family following the birth of his and his wife's second son on 29 April. Following a party-room meeting on 13 May, Labor minister Natasha Fyles was elected unopposed to the leadership, and was sworn in as the new Chief Minister later day. Gunner resigned from the seat of Fannie Bay on 27 July and a by-election was held on 20 August 2022. Labor retained the seat at the by-election, with candidate Brent Potter victorious despite recording a 7 per cent swing against the party.

On 17 December 2022, Labor MP for Arafura Lawrence Costa died. This triggered  a by-election which will be held on 18 March 2023.

Election date
The parliament has fixed four-year terms, with elections to be held on the fourth Saturday of August every four years.

Pre-election pendulum

References

External links 
 Northern Territory Electoral Commission

Elections in the Northern Territory
Northern Territory
Northern Territory